Lyudmila Vladimirovna Mayakovskaya (24 August 1884, Nikitino — 12 September 1972, Moscow) was a Russian and Soviet textile designer and teacher. She was given the title of Merited Cultural Worker of the RSFSR. She was the elder sister of the poet Vladimir Mayakovsky.

Life 
Lyudmila Mayakovskaya was born on August 24, 1884 in Armenia in the village of Nikitino. In 1910 she graduated from the Stroganov Moscow State Academy of Arts and Industry, worked as an artist-designer for textiles at the Moscow enterprises «Trekhgornaya textile manufacture» and the Red Banner Textile Factory in Moscow, where she headed the aerography workshop. Mayakovskaya was the first woman in the factory who held an administrative and technical position before the revolution in Russia.

In 1925, she participated in the International Exhibition of Modern Decorative and Industrial Arts in Paris, where she received a silver medal for her work. In the same year, she invents and patents a new method of obtaining patterns in Russia.

From 1929 to 1949 she taught at the faculty of tissue design at the Moscow State Textile University and was an assistant professor in the special compositions department. She was preparing fabric artists at Vkhutemas. Among her students were artists such as Tatiana Klyukas, Natalia Ganina-Kravtsova, Natalia Kiseleva and others.

She has published several biographical books about her brother, Vladimir Mayakovsky.

The exhibitions of Ludmila Mayakovskaya were held in France, United Kingdom, Italy, Russia. The name of Lyudmila Mayakovskaya is included in the catalog «Women of Russian Avant-garde», published in the USA. The works of Mayakovskaya for the American catalog were selected personally by Giorgio Armani.

Honours and awards 
 Silver Medal of the International Exhibition of Modern Decorative and Industrial Arts (1925)
 Diploma of Honor and the 2nd prize of the 1st Art Exhibition «Household Soviet Textiles» (1929)
 Medal "In Commemoration of the 800th Anniversary of Moscow" (1948)
 Merited Cultural Worker of the RSFSR (1964)
 Order of the Red Banner of Labour (1964)

References

External links 
 Textiles by Lyudmila Mayakovskaya
 Poet's family
 Lyudmila Mayakovskaya sister of poet Vladimir Mayakovsky

People from Lori Province
Burials at Novodevichy Cemetery
Artists from Moscow
Russian painters
Women textile artists
Feminist artists
Russian women painters
Russian women short story writers
20th-century Russian women writers
Textile designers
1884 births
1972 deaths
Russian textile artists
Academic staff of Moscow State Textile University
Stroganov Moscow State Academy of Arts and Industry alumni
Soviet painters